"Wanted" is a popular song written by Jack Fulton and Lois Steele.  A recording by Perry Como was the most popular version, reaching No. 1 in the US.  Al Martino also recorded a version which reached No. 4 in the UK.

Background
Perry Como recorded a version on December 29, 1953.  This song was accompanied by Hugo Winterhalter's orchestra and chorus, and it was recorded at Manhattan Center, New York City. 
It was released by RCA Victor as catalog number 20-5647 (in US) and by EMI on the His Master's Voice label as catalog number B 10691. The flip side of the US version was "Look Out The Window (And See How I'm Standing In The Rain)". Como's version of "Wanted" reached No. 1 on Billboard'''s chart in 1954. It was the most played song on radio as well as on jukebox in the US in 1954, and the second best-selling song of the year.

Charts

Other recordings
Al Martino also had a top 10 hit with the song in the United Kingdom. 
Another early recorded version is by singer pianist Moon Mullican.
Anne Murray recorded a cover of the song for her album Croonin''' (1993).

Popular culture
The song was featured in a Christmas episode of "WKRP in Cincinnati", in a flashback to 12/24/54.

References 

Number-one singles in the United States
1954 singles
Perry Como songs
1952 songs
Songs written by Jack Fulton